Simeon B. Robbins House, or The Miner's Cabin, is a historic home located at Franklinville in Cattaraugus County, New York. It is a three-story, Queen Anne style wood frame dwelling built in 1895. The building features three towers.  It is currently used as a museum and meeting space by the Ischua Valley Historical Society.

It was listed on the National Register of Historic Places in 2003.

References

Houses on the National Register of Historic Places in New York (state)
Queen Anne architecture in New York (state)
Houses completed in 1895
Houses in Cattaraugus County, New York
National Register of Historic Places in Cattaraugus County, New York